Charles Louis Domanico  (January 20, 1944 – October 17, 2002), better known as Chuck Domanico, was an American jazz bassist who played double bass and bass guitar on the West Coast jazz scene.

Domanico was born in Chicago. He settled in Los Angeles in the mid-1960s. For nearly forty years, he was a central jazz figure in Hollywood who contributed to many movies and TV programs. Domanico worked with Frank Sinatra, Barbra Streisand, Carmen McRae, Joni Mitchell, Taj Mahal, Diane Schuur, Natalie Cole, and  The Manhattan Transfer. He participated in instrumental jazz performances by Chet Baker, Henry Mancini, Shelly Manne, Oliver Nelson, John Klemmer, Roger Kellaway, Barney Kessel, and Art Pepper.

His bass can be heard in themes for television shows like M*A*S*H, Cheers and Frasier, and he contributed to the soundtracks of more than two thousand films.

Domanico died of lung cancer in Los Angeles at the age of 58.

Discography

As sideman
Unless otherwise noted, Information is taken from AllMusic

With Don Ellis Orchestra
Don Ellis Orchestra 'Live' at Monterey! (Pacific Jazz, 1966)
With Anthony Ortega
New Dance! (Revelation, 1967)
With Emil Richards
New Time Element (Uni, 1967)
Luntana (Interworld, 1996)
With Oliver Nelson
The Sound of Feeling (Verve, 1968)
Black, Brown and Beautiful (Flying Dutchman, 1970)
Skull Session (Flying Dutchman, 1975)
Stolen Moments (East Wind, 1975)
With Tom Scott
Rural Still Life (Impulse!, 1968)
Hair to Jazz (Flying Dutchman, 1969)
Paint Your Wagon (Flying Dutchman, 1970)
Great Scott! (A&M, 1972)
Tom Scott in L.A. (Flying Dutchman, 1975)
With Ron Anthony
Oh! Calcutta! (1969)
With Bob Thiele Emergency
Head Start (Flying Dutchman, 1969)
With Clare Fischer
Thesaurus (Atlantic, 1969)
Waltz (1969) 
Reclamation Act of 1972 (Revelation, 1972)
With Kai Winding and J. J. Johnson
Betwixt & Between (CTI, 1969)
With Stan Kenton
Hair (Capitol, 1969)
With Barney Kessel
Feeling Free (Contemporary, 1969)
Barney Plays Kessel (Concord Jazz, 1975)
The Artistry (1984)
With Howard Roberts
Spinning Wheel (Capitol, 1969)
With Townes Van Zandt
Our Mother the Mountain (Poppy, 1969)
With Dave Mackay & Vicky Hamilton
Rainbows (Impulse!, 1970)
With João Donato
A Bad Donato (Blue Thumb, 1970)
With Scott McKenzie
Stained Glass Morning (Ode, 1970)
With Pisano & Ruff
Under the Blanket (A&M, 1970)
With Marc Benno
Minnows (A&M, 1971)
With Les Crane
Desiderata (Warner Bros., 1971)
With Roger Kellaway
Roger Kellaway Cello Quartet (A&M, 1971)
Come to the Meadow (A&M, 1974)
Nostalgia Suite (Discwater, 1978) 
Windows (Angel, 1993)
As It Happened Vol. 1 (Jazz Heritage, 2002; Recorded in 1982)
With Lani Hall
Sun Down Lady (A&M, 1972)
Sweet Bird (A&M, 1976)
Double or Nothing (A&M, 1979)
Brasil Nativo (Windham Hill, 1998)
With Harvey Mandel
The Snake (Janus, 1972)
With Carmen McRae
The Great American Songbook (Atlantic, 1972)
With Melanie
Stoneground Words (Neighborhood, 1972)
Madrugada (Neighborhood, 1974)
With Gerry Mulligan
The Age of Steam (A&M, 1972)
With Carroll O'Connor
Remembering You (A&M, 1972)
With Cyril Havermans
Cyril (MGM, 1973)
With Victor Feldman
Your Smile (Choice, 1974)
The Artful Dodger (Concord Jazz, 1977)
 Rockavibabe (DJM, 1977)
In My Pocket (Cohearent, 1978)  
Rio Nights (TBA, 1987)
The Best of Feldman and the Generation Band (Nova, 1989)
With Henry Mancini
Hangin' Out with Henry Mancini (RCA, 1974)
Switch: Original Score (Varése Sarabande, 1991)
With Phoebe Snow
Phoebe Snow (Shelter, 1974)
It Looks Like Snow (Columbia, 1976)
With Elek Bacsik
Bird and Dizzy: A Musical Tribute (Flying Dutchman, 1975)
With Richard "Groove" Holmes
 Six Million Dollar Man  (Flying Dutchman, 1975)
With Rita Coolidge
It's Only Love (A&M, 1975)
Out of the Blue (Beacon, 1996)
With Terry Garthwaite
Terry (Arista, 1975)
With Richard "Groove" Holmes
Six Million Dollar Man (Flying Dutchman, 1975)
With Bobby Hutcherson
Montara (Blue Note, 1975)
Un Poco Loco (Columbia, 1980; Recorded in 1979)
With John Klemmer
Touch (ABC, 1975)
Barefoot Ballet (ABC, 1976)
Lifestyle (Living & Loving) (ABC, 1977)
The Best...Vol. 1: Mosaic (MCA, 1980)
Music (MCA, 1989)
With Louis Bellson
The Drum Session (Philips, 1975)
The Drum Session Vol. 2 (Philips, 1977)
With Danny O'Keefe
So Long Harry Truman (Atlantic, 1975)
With Moacir Santos
Carnival of the Spirits (Blue Note, 1975)
With Tennessee Ernie Ford & Glen Campbell
Ernie Sings & Glen Picks (Capitol, 1975)
With Peter Allen
Taught by Experts (A&M, 1976)
With Barbara Carroll
Barbara Carroll (Blue Note, 1976)
With Sonny Criss
Warm & Sonny (ABC, 1976)
The Joy of Sax (ABC, 1977)
With Bonnie Koloc
Close-Up (Epic, 1976)
With Shelly Manne
Plays Richard Rodgers' Musical 'Rex (Discovery, 1976)
Essence (Galaxy, 1977)
Jazz Quartet Interpretations (Trend, 1980)
Goodbye for Bill Evans (Polydor, 1981)
Double Piano...at Carmelo's Vol. 1 (Trend, 1981)
Double Piano...at Carmelo's, Vol. 2 (Trend, 1982)With Wade MarcusMetamorphosis (ABC, 1976)With Joni MitchellHejira (Asylum, 1976)With Jaye P. MorganJaye P. Morgan (Candor, 1976)With Jimmy PonderIllusions (ABC, 1976)With Ray Charles and Cleo LainePorgy & Bess (RCA, 1976)With J. D. SoutherBlack Rose (Asylum, 1976)With The TubesYoung and Rich (A&M, 1976)With Voudouris & KahneStreet Player (Capitol, 1976)With Mike WoffordScott Joplin: Interpretations '76 (Flying Dutchman, 1976)With Laurindo AlmeidaVirtuoso Guitar (Crystal Clear, 1977)With Gato BarbieriRuby, Ruby (A&M, 1977)With Claus Ogerman OrchestraGate of Dreams (Warner Bros., 1977)With John DenverI Want to Live (RCA, 1977)With Joe HarnellHarnell (Capitol, 1977)With Henry Mancini & John LawsJust You and Me Together Love (RCA, 1977)With Blue MitchellAfrican Violet (Impulse!, 1977)With The Pointer SistersHaving a Party (ABC, 1977)With Ben SidranThe Doctor Is In (Arista, 1977)With Dennis WilsonPacific Ocean Blue (Caribou, 1977)With Ry CooderJazz (Warner Bros., 1978)With Lorraine FeatherSweet Lorraine (Concord Jazz, 1978)With Rodney FranklinIn the Center (CBS, 1978)With Michael FranksBurchfield Nines (Warner Bros., 1978)With Ted GärdestadBlue Virgin Isles (Polar, 1978)With Herb Alpert and Hugh MasekelaHerb Alpert / Hugh Masekela (A&M, 1978)With The MoirsState of Shock (Rocket, 1978)With The Singers UnlimitedJust in Time (Pausa, 1978)With Allyn Ferguson & Jack ElliottThe Orchestra (FNAM, 1979)With Gabe BaltazarStan Kenton Presents Gabe Baltazar (Creative World, 1979)With Freddie HubbardThe Love Connection (Columbia, 1979)With The Manhattan TransferExtensions (Atlantic, 1979)
The Christmas Album (Columbia, 1992)With Shelly Manne and Lee KonitzFrench Concert (Galaxy, 1979)With Toni BrownToni Brown (Fantasy, 1979)With Jimmy SmithThe Cat Strikes Again (Inner City, 1980)With SpinettaOnly Love Can Sustain (Columbia, 1980)With Sonny StittGroovin' High (Atlas, 1980)With Bobby Shew QuartetDebut (Discomate, 1981)With Bobby EnriquezThe Wild Man (GNP Cresendo, 1981)With The CarpentersVoice of the Heart (A&M, 1983)With Steve Perry Street Talk (Columbia, 1984)With Bobby and the MidnitesWhere the Beat Meets the Street (Columbia, 1984)With Sam HarrisSam Harris (Motown, 1984)With Patti AustinPatti Austin (Qwest, 1984)
The Real Me (Qwest, 1988)With Diane SchuurSchuur Thing (GRP, 1985)
In Tribute (GRP, 1992)
Love Songs (GRP, 1993)With Lou RawlsLove All Your Blues Away (Epic, 1986)With Herb AlpertKeep Your Eye on Me (A&M, 1987)With George Benson & Earl KlughCollaboration (Warner Bros., 1987) With Sarah Vaughan & Milton NascimentoBrazilian Romance (Columbia, 1987)With Brandon FieldsThe Traveler (Nova, 1988)With Claude Bolling & Hubert LawsCalifornia Suite (Columbia, 1988)With Rod McKuenIt Had to Be You (Desert Island, 1989)With Bonnie RaittNick of Time (Capitol, 1989)With Joe SampleSpellbound (Warner Bros., 1989)With Iggy PopBrick by Brick (Virgin, 1990)With Julio IglesiasStarry Night (Columbia, 1990)With Monica LewisMy Favorite Things (DRG, 1990)
Swings Jule Styne (DRG, 1992)With The SimpsonsThe Simpsons Sing the Blues (Geffen, 1990)With Dionne WarwickDionne Warwick Sings Cole Porter (Arista, 1990)With Dwight YoakamIf There Was a Way (Reprise, 1990)
Under the Covers (Reprise, 1997)
A Long Way Home (Reprise, 1998)With Pat BenatarTrue Love (Chrysalis, 1991)
Synchronistic Wanderings (Chrysalis, 1999)
Christmas in America (Gold Circle, 2001)With David BenoitShadows (GRP, 1991)With Teresa Brewer16 Most Requested Songs  (Columbia, 1991)With Natalie ColeUnforgettable... with Love (Elektra, 1991)
Stardust (Elektra, 1996)With Barry ManilowShowstoppers (Arista, 1991)
Manilow Sings Sinatra (Arista, 1998)With Cheryl BentyneSomething Cool (Columbia, 1992)With Michael BoltonTimeless: The Classics (Columbia, 1992)
This Is The Time: The Christmas Album (Columbia, 1996)With Peter HofmannSingt Elvis Presley: Love Me Tender (Columbia, 1992)With Shirley HornHere's to Life (Verve, 1992)
You're My Thrill (Verve, 2001)With Robert PalmerRidin' High (EMI, 1992)With Tommy TedescoPerforms Roumanis' Jazz Rhapsody for Guitar & Orchestra (Capri, 1992)With Wilson PhillipsShadows and Light (SBK, 1992)With Harry Connick Jr.When My Heart Finds Christmas (Columbia, 1993)
Come by Me (Columbia, 1999)With David FosterThe Christmas Album (Interscope, 1993)With Taj MahalDancing the Blues (Private Music, 1993)With Johnny MathisHow Do You Keep the Music Playing? (Columbia, 1993)
Mathis on Broadway (Columbia, 2000)With Terry TrotterIt's About Time (Mama, 1993)With Carnie & Wendy WilsonHey Santa! (SBK, 1993)With David Benoit & Russ FreemanThe Benoit/Freeman Project (GRP, 1994)With Julia Migenes & Michael KamenSmile (Elektra, 1994)With Kenny RogersTimepiece (143, 1994)With Margie Gibson & Lincoln MayorgaSay It with Music (1994)With Lori LiebermanA Thousand Dreams (Pope Music, 1994)With John RaittBroadway Legend (Angel, 1995)With Diana RossTake Me Higher (Motown, 1995)With Anne Kerry FordIn the Nest of the Moon (Illyria, 1996)With Michael LangDays of Wine and Roses (Varese Sarabande, 1996)With David Garfield & FriendsTribute To Jeff Porcaro (Zebra, 1997)With Niki HarisDreaming a Dream (BMG, 1997)With Ottmar LiebertLeaning into the Night (Sony Classical / BMG, 1997)With Jon SecadaSecada (Virgin, 1997)With Bette MidlerBathhouse Betty (Warner Bros., 1998)With Céline DionThese Are Special Times (Epic Records, 1998)With Neil DiamondThe Movie Album: As Time Goes By (Columbia Records, 1998)
Three Chord Opera (Columbia Records, 2001)With Mary J. BligeMary (MCA Records, 1999)With Barbra StreisandChristmas Memories (Columbia Records, 2001)With Lee Ann Womack'''The Season for Romance'' (MCA Records, 2002)

References

External links
Tribute on Web site "Jussta"

American jazz double-bassists
Male double-bassists
American jazz bass guitarists
Deaths from lung cancer in California
1944 births
2002 deaths
20th-century American bass guitarists
Guitarists from Chicago
American male bass guitarists
Jazz musicians from Illinois
20th-century double-bassists
20th-century American male musicians
American male jazz musicians